, is a binary trans-Neptunian object discovered on 8 September 2011 by the Pan-STARRS survey at the Haleakalā Observatory in Hawaii. It was found by Pan-STARRS on 20 November 2014 and was announced later in July 2016 after additional observations and precovery identifications. It is in the Kuiper belt, a region of icy objects orbiting beyond Neptune in the outer Solar System. It is classified as a plutino, a dynamical class of objects in a 2:3 orbital resonance with Neptune. On 1 December 2018, a team of astronomers observed a stellar occultation by the object, which revealed that it is a compact binary system consisting of two separate components in close orbit around each other.

Observations

Discovery 
Before the announcement of its discovery,  had been observed by the Pan-STARRS survey from 2011 to 2015. All of these observations were made with the Pan-STARRS 1 1.8-meter Ritchey–Chrétien telescope, located at the Haleakalā Observatory atop the Hawaiian island of Maui. The accredited observers using the telescope were B. Gibson, T. Goggia, N. Primak, A. Schultz, and M. Willman. The object was first identified on 20 November 2014, though it was announced later in a Minor Planet Electronic Circular published on 17 July 2016, after additional observations by Pan-STARRS had been found, preceding the team's original observation from 2014. While  is the object's first and only provisional designation assigned by the Minor Planet Center, the date of discovery is considered to be on 8 September 2011, which was the earliest known observation of the object before it was assigned a minor planet number.

Occultation 
On 1 December 2018,  occulted a 15th-magnitude double star, blocking out its starlight for a maximal duration of approximately 11 seconds. The stellar occultation was observed by astronomers and citizen scientists across the West Coast of the United States and Canada. Of the 41 participating sites, six of them reported dimmings in the star's brightness, signifying likely positive detections of the occultation. Five of these sites reported two consecutive dimmings due to the occulted star's double nature;  occulted one of the two stars being observed. These observations were part of a campaign coordinated by the Research and Education Collaborative Occultation Network (RECON), a citizen science project dedicated to observing occultations by trans-Neptunian objects.

Prior to the occultation,  had only been observed by Pan-STARRS over an observation arc of 3 years. The calculated orbit from these Pan-STARRS observations had significant uncertainty, which would have been unreliable for predicting occultations. Follow-up observations by Pan-STARRS were also conducted through 2016–2018 and helped extend 's observation arc to 6.3 years. Although an observation arc of this length is generally unreliable for predicting occultations especially by distant objects, this was compensated by Pan-STARRS's highly accurate astrometric system, allowing for 's orbital uncertainty to be significantly reduced.

Orbit and classification 
 is classified as a plutino, a subgroup of the resonant trans-Neptunian objects located in the inner region of Kuiper belt. Named after the group's largest member, Pluto, the plutinos are in a 2:3 mean-motion orbital resonance with Neptune. This is characteristic of all plutinos, which have orbital periods around 250 years and semi-major axes around 39 AU.

Like Pluto, 's orbit is elongated and inclined to the ecliptic.  has an orbital eccentricity of 0.25 and an orbital inclination of 19.5 degrees with respect to the ecliptic. Over the course of its orbit, 's distance from the Sun varies from 29.5 AU at perihelion (closest distance) to 48.9 AU at aphelion (farthest distance).  has last passed aphelion in the early 20th century, and is now moving closer to the Sun, approaching perihelion by 2032. Simulations by the Deep Ecliptic Survey show that  can acquire a perihelion distance (qmin) as small as 28.7 AU over the next 10 million years.

Binary system 

Observations of the December 2018 occultation revealed that  is a compact binary system consisting of two separate components in close orbit around each other. Of the six sites that reported positive detections of the occultation, one site located in Bishop, California, detected a shorter dimming event separate from the main detections by the other five sites located south of it.

Since the two components were only observed for a short period of time during the occultation, the binary system's orbital parameters have not been determined. Such tight binary TNOs are difficult to resolve with direct imaging due to their characteristic small separation distances between their components.

Most models of the formation of the Solar System indicate that most TNOs have formed as binaries, hence they are expected to be common especially in the Kuiper belt population.

Physical characteristics 
The diameter ratio of the secondary to the primary is 0.76:1.00—the secondary component is approximately 75% as large as the primary. Since the mutual orbit of the components is undetermined, the mass and density of the  system cannot be derived. The individual components of the  system are among the smallest trans-Neptunian objects with sizes measured with stellar occultations, following the Kuiper belt object 486958 Arrokoth (~).

Given the components' estimated diameters and their combined absolute magnitude of 7.2, their calculated geometric albedos indicate that they have dark surfaces, reflecting about 5% of incident visible light. However, the estimated geometric albedo may be subject to a systematic error depending on the true shapes and photometric properties of the components, resulting in a significant uncertainty of ±2%. Nonetheless,  is one of the darkest objects measured with stellar occultations, being darker than 486958 Arrokoth.

Numbering and naming 
This minor planet was numbered by the Minor Planet Center on 25 September 2018 and received the number  in the minor planet catalog. As of 2020, it has not been named.

References

External links 
 SwRI study describes discovery of close binary trans-Neptunian object, 28 September 2020, Southwest Research Institute
 A stellar occultation by a small plutino with RECON, Rodrigo Leiva et al., September 2019, Europlanet Science Congress–Division for Planetary Sciences Joint Meeting 2019
 Tight and contact TNO binaries with stellar occultations, Marc W. Buie et al., 2019
 (523764) 2014 WC510, Wm. Robert Johnston, Asteroids with Satellites Database—Johnston's Archive, 11 October 2020
 

Plutinos
Minor planet object articles (numbered)
Binary trans-Neptunian objects
Discoveries by Pan-STARRS
Objects observed by stellar occultation
20110908